The University of Alabama at Birmingham (UAB) is a public research university in Birmingham, Alabama. Founded in 1969 in the University of Alabama System, UAB has grown to be the state's largest single employer, with more than 24,000 faculty and staff and over 53,000 jobs at the university and in the health system. The university is classified among "R1: Doctoral Universities – Very high research activity".

UAB offers 140 programs of study in 12 academic divisions leading to bachelor's, master's, doctoral, and professional degrees in the liberal arts, humanities, mathematics, social, behavioral, natural and physical sciences, business, education, engineering, and health-related fields such as medicine, dentistry, optometry, nursing, and public health. In the fall of 2020, 22,563 students from more than 110 countries were enrolled.

The UAB Health System, one of the largest academic medical centers in the United States, is affiliated with the university. UAB Hospital sponsors residency programs in medical specialties, including internal medicine, neurology, physical medicine and rehabilitation, surgery, radiology, and anesthesiology.

History 
In 1936, in response to the rapid growth of the Birmingham metropolitan area and the need for the population to have access to a university education, the University of Alabama in Tuscaloosa established the Birmingham Extension Center. The center operated in an old house in downtown Birmingham at 2131 6th Avenue North and enrolled 116 students. In 1945, UA's newly established four-year School of Medicine moved from Tuscaloosa to Birmingham and took over management of Jefferson and Hillman hospitals. In 1957 enrollment at the extension center stood at 1,856. By 1959, research grants, training grants, and fellowships exceeded $1 million, and ground was broken for a new Children's Hospital.

By the 1960s, it grew apparent that the extension center was becoming a university in its own right. An engineering building was built close to the medical center in 1962. In September 1966, the Extension Center was renamed the College of General Studies and elevated to a full four-year program. That November, the College of General Studies and the School of Medicine were merged into the University of Alabama in Birmingham, with Dr. Joseph Volker as "Vice President for Birmingham Affairs"–reflecting that it was still treated as an offsite department of the main campus in Tuscaloosa. An Advisory Board for UAB was created in 1967. In 1969, the legislature created the University of Alabama System. UAB became one of three four-year institutions within the new system, which also included UA and the University of Alabama in Huntsville (UAH) in Huntsville. Volker became UAB's first president.

In the 1970s, the university began a period of rapid growth. Enrollment at the beginning of the decade stood at 6,629, including 2,724 women. To accommodate the growing student population, UAB acquired land in the Southside. UAB Mini Park (the predecessor to The UAB Green) was dedicated in 1977.

The university created an intercollegiate athletic program, joined the NCAA and began fielding teams beginning with golf in 1970 and men's basketball in 1978. The university's name was changed to the University of Alabama at Birmingham in 1984, simply exchanging the preposition "In" for "at."

Presidents of UAB
 Joseph F. Volker, 1966–1976 (titled as VP for Birmingham Affairs, 1966–1969)
 S. Richardson Hill Jr., 1977–1987
 Charles A. McCallum, 1987–1993
 J. Claude Bennett, 1993–1996
 Paul Hardin, 1997 (interim)
 W. Ann Reynolds, 1997–2002
 Carol Garrison, 2002–2012
 Ray L. Watts, 2013–present

Campus 

UAB is located in the Southside neighborhood of downtown Birmingham. Occupying more than 100 city blocks, the roughly rectangular campus blends with the urban character of the Southside, stretching between 4th Ave S and 12th Ave S north to south and 8th St and 22nd St east to west. University Boulevard serves as the main axis of the rectangle and Campus Green sits approximately at the center.

The campus can be divided into three sections. The medical center occupies most of the campus east of Campus Green. The medical center is home to the health science schools and their teaching facilities, including the UAB Health System (UABHS). The medical center overlaps with the larger Birmingham Medical District where, in addition to UABHS, non-UAB affiliated hospitals such as the VA Medical Center Birmingham, Children's Hospital of Alabama and Cooper Green Mercy Hospital are located.

The academic heart of campus stretches from the Campus Green west and from University Boulevard south. Campus Green, developed between 2000 and 2007 as part of the move to convert the school from its previously commuter school feel into a more traditional residential campus, not only anchors the academic campus but serves as the centerpiece for the university as a whole. Most academics and arts buildings (excluding those associated with the medical center), residence halls, and student life facilities sit on or within two blocks of the Green.

Athletics facilities, including Bartow Arena and PNC Field are located on the far western side of campus.

Since 1969, UAB has undergone extensive growth and construction projects are common across campus. Projects that are in planning, recently completed, or under construction include:
 Collat School of Business and Bill L. Harbert Institute for Innovation and Entrepreneurship, ribbon cutting on August 28, 2019.
 Police and Public Safety Headquarters, ribbon cutting on August 9, 2018.
 School of Nursing, ribbon cutting on September 6, 2018.
 College of Arts & Sciences University Hall - the first LEED-certified building on UAB campus - ribbon cutting on September, 2019.

Organization and administration 

UAB is an autonomous institution within the University of Alabama System, which is governed by the Board of Trustees of the University of Alabama and headed by Chancellor of the University of Alabama. The board is self-nominating and composed of 15 elected members and two ex officio members. The makeup of the board is dictated by the Constitution of the State of Alabama, and requires that the board be made up of three members from the congressional district that contains the Tuscaloosa campus, and two members from every other congressional district in Alabama. Board members are elected by the board and are confirmed by the Alabama State Senate. Board members may serve three consecutive six-year terms.

The president of the University of Alabama at Birmingham is the principal executive officer of the university and is appointed by the chancellor with approval of the board of trustees. The president reports directly to the chancellor, and is responsible for the daily operations of the university. The president also acts as chairman of the board of the UAB Health System. Richard Marchase was named interim president on August 21, 2012, after the retirement of former president Carol Garrison. In February 2013, Ray L. Watts became UAB's seventh president.

Colleges 
UAB is composed of one college, nine schools and the Graduate School. Together, these divisions offer 56 bachelor's degree programs, 59 master's degree programs, and 40 doctoral programs.

Before 2010, the schools of Arts and Humanities, Social and Behavioral Sciences, Natural Science and Mathematics, and Education were separate, degree-granting units within the university. The schools were merged into a single college (the first at UAB): the College of Arts and Sciences, with Education retaining its identity as a distinct unit within the new college. University leaders cited efficiency, curricula, and more opportunity for interdisciplinary research and cooperation for the restructuring.

Endowment 
UAB's endowment stood at $495.3 million in 2017.

In 1999, the university launched a capital campaign with a goal of $250 million. When it ended in 2003, the UAB Capital Campaign had raised over $388.7 million.

The Campaign for UAB launched publicly in October 2013 with a goal of raising $1 billion. Prior to the public launch of the campaign, UAB had already received over $420 million in donations. In 2018, UAB exceeded the $1 billion goal of The Campaign for UAB, the most ambitious fundraising effort in the university's history. Putting the Campaign over its goal was the largest single gift ever made to UAB: $30 million from O’Neal Industries and its shareholders to name the O’Neal Comprehensive Cancer Center at UAB.

Academics 

UAB is a large, four-year research university and is classified among "R1: Doctoral Universities – Very high research activity". UAB has been accredited by the Southern Association of Colleges and Schools since 1970, according to the U.S. Department of Education. Undergraduates comprise a majority of the total university enrollment. Part-time and transfer student comprise a sizable portion of the undergraduate student body. The undergraduate instructional program provides a balance between professional programs of study and the liberal arts (meaning the number of degrees awarded in the two areas is similar), and there is a high level of co-existence between the graduate and undergraduate programs (meaning that the majority of undergraduate program have graduate degree program counterparts). The university has a high level of research activity and has a graduate instructional program emphasizing doctorates in STEM fields as well as professional programs in the health and veterinary sciences.

The academic calendar is based on the semester system, which divides the academic year, lasting from mid-August to early May, into two 15-week semesters (fall and spring) and the summer. The fall semester ends in early December and the spring term begins in early January. The summer, which lasts from mid-May to August, is divided into a number of sessions: a 12-week session, a 3-week "mini-semester" in May, a nine-week session in June and July, and two four-week sessions in June and July, respectively. The schools of medicine and dentistry follow an academic calendar beginning in July and ending in late May/early June.

In academic year 2016–2017, UAB awarded in a total 2,384 bachelor's degrees; 1,795 master's degrees, 33 educational specialist degrees; 125 research doctorates; and 391 professional doctorates.

Student profile 
In fall semester 2018, the UAB student body consisted of 13,836 undergraduates, 6,933 graduate students and 1,154 professional doctoral students from all 67 Alabama counties, all 50 states and more than 110 foreign countries. In fall semester 2018, 5,737 students were enrolled in the College of Arts and Sciences, 3,432 in Business, 2,736 in Nursing, 2,431 in Health Professions, 1,775 in Education, 1,486 in Engineering, 752 in Public Health, 694 in Medicine, 324 in Joint Health Sciences, 271 in Dentistry, 217 in Optometry, and an additional 1,902 who were undecided.

Of the undergraduate student body, 33.2% are from Jefferson County, 14.4% are from other counties in the Birmingham metropolitan area, specifically Blount, Shelby, St. Clair and Walker counties. 29.4% come from the rest of Alabama, 18.2% from the rest of the United States, while international students comprise 4.8%. The male-to-female ratio among undergraduates is 2:3. Reflecting one of the core reasons for UAB's founding, a large percentage of undergraduates are from non-traditional demographics. 27.4% of undergraduates are part-time students, and 18.7% are above the age of 25. (The average undergraduate is 23 years old.)

The undergraduate student body was 56% non-Hispanic white, 26% Black/African-American, 6% Asian, 5% two or more races, 3% Hispanic, and 3% International.

Faculty and staff 
UAB has 21,245 employees, 11,810 in the university, including 2,543 faculty, and 9,435 in the UAB Health System. 91.3% of the faculty at UAB hold an academic or professional doctorate. Eight faculty members from UAB have been elected to the National Institute of Medicine. The student-faculty ratio at UAB is 18:1.

Library 
UAB has eight library locations: Mervyn H. Sterne Library, Lister Hill Library of the Health Sciences, Lister Hill Library at University Hospital, Reynolds-Finley Historical Library, Alabama Museum of the Health Sciences, UAB Archives, UAB Digital Collections, and the 801 Building.
Sterne Library holds 1.7 million print volumes while Lister Hill Library holds a little under 350,000.

Rankings 

In the 2022 U.S. News & World Report rankings, UAB was tied for the 148th best national university and was ranked tied for the 67th best public university. The UAB Master of Science in Health Administration program is the top ranked Health Care Management program in the U.S. News & World Report rankings and the only No. 1 program at UAB. Since 2015, the MSHA program has been the highest-ranking program at UAB.

In 2018, UAB was named the Top Young University in the U.S. (50 years or younger) and among the top 10 globally in the Times Higher Education World University Rankings, which ranks effectiveness in areas such as teaching, research, citations, international outlooks and industry outcomes.

Student life 

There are over 300 student organizations on the UAB campus.

The UAB Model Arab League team is among the best government model teams in the nation with over five years of expansion and award-winning achievement including multiple "outstanding delegation" awards. The UAB Mock Trial team is consistently among the nation's best as a perennial Top 25 program. The program enjoyed its greatest success in 2006, when the team won the national title in the Silver Division defeating the defending national champions of Harvard University.

Recreation Center 

Opened in 2005, the UAB Recreation Center serves the students, faculty, and alumni of UAB as well as the Birmingham community. The  covers three floors: housing four basketball/volleyball courts, four racquetball courts (one of which can be converted to squash and four for wallyball), four aerobics studios,  of weight and cardio-fitness areas, game room, KidsZone, aquatics center with both lap and leisure components, CenterCourt gym used for indoor soccer, floor hockey and badminton, juice bar, indoor track, and a climbing wall. The center includes free weights, court sports, swimming pools, group fitness classes, nutrition education, fitness areas, and a climbing wall.

Greek life 
About six percent of undergraduate men and eight percent of undergraduate women are active in UAB's Greek system. Twenty-two Greek Letter Organization (GLOs) are active on campus. Four governing bodies oversee the operations of university-sanctioned GLOs. These bodies act as umbrella organizations over the member GLOs. Among the differences between the governing bodies, the most important distinction are recruitment process and policies.

The Interfraternity Council (IFC) governs men's GLOs (also known as fraternities). Members are
Alpha Tau Omega (ΑΤΩ)
Alpha Sigma Phi (ΑΣΦ)
Delta Sigma Phi (ΔΣΦ)
Lambda Chi Alpha (ΛΧΑ)
Theta Chi (ΘΧ)
Phi Gamma Delta (ΦΓΔ/FIJI)
Pi Kappa Phi (ΠΚΦ)
Sigma Chi (ΣΧ)

The Panhellenic Council (NPC) governs women's GLOs (also known as sororities). Members are
Alpha Gamma Delta (ΑΓΔ) (colonized at UAB in 1978), 
Alpha Omicron Pi (ΑΟΠ) (1987), 
Alpha Xi Delta (ΑΞΔ) (1996), 
Delta Gamma (ΔΓ) (1991), 
Sigma Kappa (ΣΚ) (2015)
Kappa Delta (ΚΔ) (2017).

The National Pan-Hellenic Council (NPHC) governs historically black GLOs. Member fraternities are 
Alpha Phi Alpha (ΑΦΑ) (ΙΝ chapter, founded at UAB in 1974)
Kappa Alpha Psi (ΚΑΨ) (ΚΚ chapter, 1980)
Omega Psi Phi (ΩΨΦ) (ΚΔ chapter, 1972)
Phi Beta Sigma (ΦΒΣ) (HE chapter, 1975)

Member sororities are 
Alpha Kappa Alpha (ΑΚΑ) (ΙΦ chapter, 1975)
Delta Sigma Theta (ΔΣΘ) (ΙΛ chapter, 1972)
Sigma Gamma Rho (ΣΓΡ) (ΞΜ chapter, 1996)
Zeta Phi Beta (ΖΦΒ) (ΓΘ chapter, 1977).

The Multicultural Greek Council (MGC) governs multicultural GLOs. Members include 
Delta Phi Omega (ΔΦΩ)
Sigma Sigma Rho (ΣΣΡ)
Beta Chi Theta (ΒΧΘ)
Delta Epsilon Psi (ΔΕΨ)
Sigma Lambda Gamma (ΣΛΓ)

Student media 
UAB Student Media is the home of the University of Alabama at Birmingham's student-run media outlets. They include Kaleidoscope, an award-winning weekly newspaper; BlazeRadio, a 24-hour online radio station live on the TuneIn app; Aura Literary Arts Review, a twice-yearly student magazine featuring fiction, creative non-fiction, art, photography, poetry and reviews; and UABTV, original, web-based video programming. UAB students operate all media. The articles, posts, newscasts and opinions are solely those of its student writers, producers, editors, deejays, etc. and do not reflect that of the university, its administrators or the Student Media advisors.

Intramurals 
The school has an intramural program that runs year-round. Students and staff compete for league trophies in sports such as basketball, bowling, flag football, golf, soccer, softball, ultimate frisbee, and volleyball, or play in tournaments in billiards, racquetball, tennis, and other sports.

On August 29, 2018, UAB held a ribbon-cutting ceremony for an Intramural Complex, located at 1101 Fifth Ave. South, that is home for the university's intramural outdoor sports and club sports. The complex is a joint project between UAB Student Affairs and Campus Recreation through the UAB Facilities Division. Campus Recreation will oversee the fields, as well as program and schedule them. The space includes two full-size competition fields, two digital scoreboards, access to water and campus Wi-Fi, and a utility building that includes two all-gender restrooms, a storage space for sports equipment, and a utility room for lights and power.

Health system 
The UAB Health System (UABHS) is a partnership between UAB and the University of Alabama Health Services Foundation (UAHSF), a private not-for-profit medical practice made up of the faculty of the UAB School of Medicine. UABHS is governed by a board of directors which has representatives of UAHSF, the University of Alabama Board of Trustees, and UAB administrators. The UAB president is the ex officio chairperson of the UAB Health System. The CEO of the UABHS reports directly to the UAB Health System board and is appointed by the chairman of the board.

UAB Hospital is the central institution of UABHS. It was formed as University Hospital in 1945 from the merger of Jefferson Hospital and Hillman Hospital, two private hospitals in the Southside of Birmingham acquired by the University of Alabama Board of Trustees. University Hospital was created to serve as the primary teaching hospital for the School of Medicine.

The other major institutions of UABHS include:
 The Kirklin Clinic of UAB Hospital, an outpatient clinic of UAB Hospital
 UAB Callahan Eye Hospital & Clinics, founded independently as the Eye Foundation Hospital in 1963 and merged into UABHS in 1973,
 UAB Medicine Women and Infants Center
 UAB Hospital-Highlands. Formerly HealthSouth's flagship medical center in the Southside, UABHS acquired it in 2006. Highlands now serves as an acute care hospital. In 2011, Highlands was merged completely into UAB Hospital.
 Spain Rehabilitation Center
 UAB Medicine Health Centers, clinics operated and staffed by UABHS located throughout central Alabama
 Viva Health, a health maintenance organization (HMO) which is a subsidiary of Triton Health Systems, a limited liability corporation based in Birmingham and owned by the UABHS

In addition UABHS manages, but does not operate, Medical West in Bessemer and Baptist Health in Montgomery. UABHS also has affiliations with the Birmingham VA Medical Center, Children's Hospital of Alabama, and Huntsville Hospital in Huntsville.

Athletics 

UAB's athletic teams are known as the Blazers. The school athletic colors are forest green and old gold. The school currently participates in NCAA Division I, currently as one of the 11 member institutions of Conference USA (C-USA). UAB is one of six C-USA members set to move to the American Athletic Conference, most likely in 2023. The men's basketball team, coached by Andy Kennedy, plays in 8,508-seat Bartow Arena.

The school started its intercollegiate athletic program in 1978. The program was inaugurated with men's basketball by Gene Bartow, who was John Wooden's successor at UCLA. Bartow left UCLA after several exceptional seasons (52–9 over three seasons, including a berth in the Final Four in 1976) to head up the founding of the first UAB men's basketball team. He served as the school's first head basketball coach and athletic director for 18 years. Bartow led UAB to the NIT in the program's second year of existence and followed that with seven straight NCAA Tournament appearances, including trips to the Sweet 16 in 1981 and the Elite Eight in 1982. Bartow retired from coaching in 1996 and, in 1997, UAB renamed its basketball venue from UAB Arena to Bartow Arena in his honor. In 30 years, UAB has made 13 NCAA appearances, three Sweet Sixteen appearances, and an Elite Eight appearance, and has had 27 winning seasons, 19 of which were 20+ win seasons.

In addition to basketball, UAB has programs in men's sports for baseball, golf, soccer, and tennis. Women's sports programs include softball, basketball, golf, soccer, tennis, track and field (indoor and outdoor), cross country, rifle and volleyball. On November 11, 2010, UAB announced the addition of sand volleyball and bowling beginning with the 2011–2012 academic year.

Professional golfer Graeme McDowell (winner of the 2010 U.S. Open) played on the UAB golf team from 1998 to 2002.

In December 2014, the university announced that three sports were being eliminated at the end of the 2014–2015 academic year: football, bowling and rifle. This was the result of an external review commissioned by the university that cited the rapidly changing landscape of the NCAA and soaring operating costs. The football program became bowl-eligible for the first time in a decade following a win against Southern Miss two days before the announcement.
On June 1, 2015, Watts announced the reversal of the decision to end UAB football due to the large public opinion against the decision and the public fundraising of more than $27 million towards the program. The Blazers football program, rifle, and bowling programs were all reinstated with the former expected to resume play as early as 2016,. On June 4, 2015, Athletic Director Mark Ingram indicated that the 2017 season was a more reasonable timeline to field a football team for play. The football team resumed play for the 2017 NCAA Football season achieving an 8–5 record, the program's best since 1993, and earning an invitation to the 2017 Bahamas Bowl, the team's first bowl game since 2004. Blazer Football had a historic season in 2018, earning the program's first Conference USA championship, first bowl win and best-ever record of 11–3.

Notable alumni and faculty

Notes

References

External links 

 
 UAB Athletics website

 
Universities and colleges accredited by the Southern Association of Colleges and Schools
Educational institutions established in 1969
Landmarks in Alabama
Schools of public health in the United States
Buildings and structures in Birmingham, Alabama
Tourist attractions in Birmingham, Alabama
Optometry schools in the United States
1969 establishments in Alabama
University of Alabama at Birmingham
University of Alabama at Birmingham
BSL3 laboratories in the United States